National bank has several meanings in banking.

National bank may also refer to:

Commercial banks
 National Australia Bank
 National Bank of Bahrain
 National Bank of Canada
 Nationalbank für Deutschland, a bank that merged into Darmstädter und Nationalbank
 National Bank of Greece
 National Bank of New Zealand

Governmental banks
 National Bank of Belgium, central bank
 National Bank of Poland, central bank
 National Bank of Romania, central bank
 Swiss National Bank, central bank
 National Bank of Ukraine, central bank

Other uses
 National Bank Act (U.S. law)
 The National Bank (band), a Norwegian rock band

See also
 Nationalbank (disambiguation)
 Second National Bank, U.S. state-sector enterprise
 Banque Nationale (disambiguation)
 Reserve Bank (disambiguation)
 Royal Bank (disambiguation)
 List of central banks
 Central bank